is a Japanese mixed martial artist and kickboxer. He has fought as a middleweight and welterweight in the Ultimate Fighting Championship and PRIDE Fighting Championship.

Mixed martial arts career

PRIDE Fighting Championships
A representative of Yoshinori Nishi's Wajyutsu Keishukai MMA dojo, Takase made his debut in PRIDE Fighting Championship at its third event, facing amateur sumo champion Emmanuel Yarborough. Outweighed by a total of 430-lbs, more than twice his own weight, Takase resolved to get his opponent tired by running around the ring, making him chase Takase, which gained him a yellow card. At the second round, Daiju tried a single leg takedown only for Yarborough to land on top of him, but the Japanese managed to get his arms free and landed punches to the head for the TKO.

Takase didn't return to PRIDE until 2002, when he got a win and a loss against Brazilians Johil de Oliveira and Nino Schembri. However, his popularity came in PRIDE 26, when he fought Chute Boxe rising star Anderson Silva. At the time, Silva was on a 9-match winning streak, and given Takase's unimpressive record, he was a heavy underdog. However, Takase surprised spectators with a first-round triangle choke submission victory. With this win, he became notable for being one of the 10 men to ever defeat Silva.

He next faced Rodrigo Gracie from the Gracie family at the first event of PRIDE Bushido, which featured a special Team Gracie vs Team Japan series of matches. Takase came to the fight wearing orange tights similar to "Gracie Hunter" Kazushi Sakuraba's, including his initials on the back. During the match, Gracie took down repeatedly Takase and landed hard ground and pound, but the Japanese was skilled enough to keep him from passing guard or knocking him out. The second round would see similar action, with Takase losing striking exchanges by punches and knees and avoiding submissions on the ground. After the action, Gracie was awarded with a unanimous decision.

At PRIDE Shockwave 2003, Takase fought former Shooto champion Hayato Sakurai. Daiju controlled a part of the first round, taking down Sakurai and bloodying his nose with punches. At this point, however, Sakurai started coming back, hijacking the standing segments with superior striking and negating Takase's submission attempts in order to do damage through his guard. The Shooto fighter ended the fight taking down Takase several times and controlling the action, which gained him a unanimous decision.

After defeating Chris Brennan by decision, Takase accomplished another of his biggest wins in his match on May 23, 2004, against grappling expert Carlos Newton. The first round of the bout saw multiple exchanges on the mat between the two contenders and increasingly complex submissions attempts by the Japanese, including an omoplata, a series of triangle chokes and even a cartwheel into a flying triangle choke while standing; however, Newton was able to defend all of them and land minor striking in every opportunity. The last half saw instead the two trading strikes, and it ended with Takase stopping Newton from passing his guard and trying a last triangle choke. After the battle, Takase was awarded the split decision.

Daiju's last apparition in PRIDE would be on April 3, 2005, losing to Daniel Acacio by TKO.

Ultimate Fighting Championship
Takase made his debut in Ultimate Fighting Championship on July 16, 1999 at UFC 21, where he was pitted against Jeremy Horn, who sported a large size advantage and a 31-4-4 record. The Japanese lost the fight by TKO after receiving a long punishment in ground and pound.

He returned at UFC 23, the second event of the promotion on Japanese ground. Takase took part in a four-man tournament which got him pitted against former RINGS fighter Kenichi Yamamoto in the semi-finals. Takase controlled portions of the fight through striking from the guard and defensive grappling, but he was ultimately defeated by unanimous decision.

Takase's final return to UFC would be in 2000 at UFC 29, fighting Brazilian jiu-jitsu exponent Fabiano Iha. The bout was short, with Iha knocking out Takase with punches in 2:24.

Other promotions
Takase most recently fought on July 25, 2015, when he got a decision loss to Yoon Dong-sik at ROAD FC 24.

Mixed martial arts record

|-
| Loss
| align=center| 12–15–2
| Dong-sik Yoon
| Decision (split)
| Road FC: Road Fighting Championship 24
| 
| align=center| 3
| align=center| 5:00
| Tokyo, Japan
|
|-
| Loss
| align=center| 12–14–2
| Carlos Toyota
| KO (punches)
| Real Fight Championship - Real 1
| 
| align=center| 1
| align=center| 0:39
| Tokyo, Japan
|
|-
| Win
| align=center| 12–13–2
| Seung-Bae Whi
| TKO (punches)
| Road FC: Road Fighting Championship 16
| 
| align=center| 1
| align=center| 4:34
| Gyeongsangbuk-do, South Korea
|
|-
| Win
| align=center| 11–13–2
| Yuji Sakuragi
| Submission (guillotine choke)
| Deep - Haleo Impact
| 
| align=center| 2
| align=center| 1:33
| Tokyo, Japan
|
|-
| Win
| align=center| 10–13–2
| Brandon Kesler
| Decision (unanimous)
| Dare Fight Sports - Dare 1/12
| 
| align=center| 3
| align=center| 5:00
| Bangkok, Thailand
|
|-
|  Draw
| align=center| 9–13–2
| Hoon Kim
| Draw (majority)
| Pancrase: Passion Tour 4
| 
| align=center| 2
| align=center| 5:00
| Tokyo, Japan
|
|-
| Win
| align=center| 9–13–1
| Mr. X
| Submission (armbar)
| TFC - Titan Fighting Championship 5
| 
| align=center| 1
| align=center| 2:17
| Tokyo, Japan
|
|-
| Win
| align=center| 8–13–1
| Shuji Morikawa
| Decision (split)
| GCM - Cage Force 11
| 
| align=center| 3
| align=center| 5:00
| Tokyo, Japan
|
|-
| Loss
| align=center| 7–13–1
| Masataka Chinushi
| KO (punch)
| Heat - Heat 8
| 
| align=center| 2
| align=center| 4:57
| Tokyo, Japan
|
|-
| Loss
| align=center| 7–12–1
| Terry Martin
| DQ (low blows)
| Adrenaline MMA: Guida vs. Russow
| 
| align=center| 2
| align=center| 3:35
| Chicago, Illinois, United States
|
|-
| Loss
| align=center| 7–11–1
| Hector Lombard
| KO (punch)
| X - plosion 13
| 
| align=center| 1
| align=center| 4:40
| Australia
|
|-
| Loss
| align=center| 7–10–1
| Daniel Acácio
| TKO (soccer kicks)
| PRIDE Bushido 6
| 
| align=center| 2
| align=center| 3:34
| Yokohama, Japan
|
|-
| Win
| align=center| 7–9–1
| Carlos Newton
| Decision (split)
| PRIDE Bushido 3
| 
| align=center| 2
| align=center| 5:00
| Yokohama, Japan
|
|-
| Win
| align=center| 6–9–1
| Chris Brennan
| Decision (unanimous)
| PRIDE Bushido 2
| 
| align=center| 2
| align=center| 5:00
| Yokohama, Japan
|
|-
| Loss
| align=center| 5–9–1
| Hayato Sakurai
| Decision (unanimous)
| PRIDE Shockwave 2003
| 
| align=center| 3
| align=center| 5:00
| Saitama, Japan
|
|-
| Loss
| align=center| 5–8–1
| Rodrigo Gracie
| Decision (unanimous)
| PRIDE Bushido 1
| 
| align=center| 2
| align=center| 5:00
| Saitama, Japan
|
|-
| Win
| align=center| 5–7–1
| Anderson Silva
| Submission (triangle choke)
| PRIDE 26
| 
| align=center| 1
| align=center| 8:33
| Yokohama, Japan
|
|-
| Loss
| align=center| 4–7–1
| Antonio Schembri
| Decision (split)
| Pride The Best Vol.2
| 
| align=center| 2
| align=center| 5:00
| Tokyo, Japan
|
|-
| Win
| align=center| 4–6–1
| Johil de Oliveira
| Decision (unanimous)
| Pride The Best Vol.1
| 
| align=center| 2
| align=center| 5:00
| Tokyo, Japan
|
|-
| Win
| align=center| 3–6–1
| LaVerne Clark
| Submission (triangle choke)
| Pancrase - 2001 Neo-Blood Tournament Opening Round
| 
| align=center| 2
| align=center| 0:16
| Tokyo, Japan
|
|-
| Loss
| align=center| 2–6–1
| Kiuma Kunioku
| Decision (majority)
| Pancrase - Proof 2
| 
| align=center| 3
| align=center| 5:00
| Osaka, Japan
|
|-
| Loss
| align=center| 2–5–1
| Fabiano Iha
| TKO (punches)
| UFC 29
| 
| align=center| 1
| align=center| 2:24
| Tokyo, Japan
|
|-
| Loss
| align=center| 2–4–1
| Nate Marquardt
| KO (knee)
| Pancrase - Trans 4
| 
| align=center| 2
| align=center| 1:30
| Tokyo, Japan
|
|-
| Win
| align=center| 2–3–1
| Daisuke Watanabe
| Decision (unanimous)
| Pancrase - Trans 1
| 
| align=center| 1
| align=center| 10:00
| Tokyo, Japan
|
|-
| Loss
| align=center| 1–3–1
| Kenichi Yamamoto
| Decision (unanimous)
| UFC 23
| 
| align=center| 3
| align=center| 5:00
| Tokyo, Japan
|
|-
| Loss
| align=center| 1–2–1
| Ikuhisa Minowa
| Submission (triangle choke)
| Pancrase - 1999 Neo-Blood Tournament Opening Round
| 
| align=center| 1
| align=center| 7:59
| Tokyo, Japan
|
|-
| Loss
| align=center| 1–1–1
| Jeremy Horn
| TKO (punches)
| UFC 21
| 
| align=center| 1
| align=center| 4:41
| Cedar Rapids, Iowa, United States
|
|-
|  Draw
| align=center| 1–0–1
| Daisuke Ishii
| Draw
| Pancrase - Breakthrough 4
| 
| align=center| 1
| align=center| 15:00
| Yokohama, Japan
|
|-
| Win
| align=center| 1–0
| Emmanuel Yarborough
| TKO (submission to punches)
| PRIDE 3
| 
| align=center| 2
| align=center| 3:22
| Tokyo, Japan
|

Kickboxing record

|-
|
|Loss
| Nangoku Chojin
|Shootboxing - 2016 Act.2
|Tokyo, Japan
|Decision (unanimous)
|align="center"|3
|align="center"|5:00
|5-4
|-
|-
|
|Win
| Ryo Sakai
|Big Bang - The Fighter 15
|Tokyo, Japan
|Decision (unanimous)
|align="center"|3
|align="center"|5:00
|5-3
|-
|-
|
|Loss
| Takeshige Hayashi
|Big Bang - Consolidation Road 22
|Tokyo, Japan
|Decision (unanimous)
|align="center"|3
|align="center"|5:00
|4-3
|-
|-
|
|Win
| Mitsuyo Hosoi
|Big Bang - The Fighter 12
|Tokyo, Japan
|Decision (unanimous)
|align="center"|3
|align="center"|5:00
|4-2
|-
|-
|
|Win
| Soichi Nishida
|Big Bang - Consolidation Road 15
|Tokyo, Japan
|Decision (unanimous)
|align="center"|3
|align="center"|5:00
|3-2
|-
|-
|
|Win
| Takeshige Hayashi
|Big Bang - Consolidation Road 5
|Tokyo, Japan
|Decision (unanimous)
|align="center"|3
|align="center"|5:00
|2-2
|-
|-
|
|Loss
| Naoki Samukawa
|Fujiwara Festival 2009
|Tokyo, Japan
|Decision (unanimous)
|align="center"|3
|align="center"|5:00
|1-2
|-
|-
|
|Loss
| Koichi Takemura
|RISE XLI
|Tokyo, Japan
|Decision (unanimous)
|align="center"|3
|align="center"|5:00
|1-1
|-
|-
|
|Win
| Ken Noisho
|J-RED Mach Go-GO '06
|Tokyo, Japan
|Decision (unanimous)
|align="center"|3
|align="center"|5:00
|1-0
|-
|-
| colspan=9 | Legend:

Submission grappling record
KO PUNCHES
|- style="text-align:center; background:#f0f0f0;"
| style="border-style:none none solid solid; "|Result
| style="border-style:none none solid solid; "|Opponent
| style="border-style:none none solid solid; "|Method
| style="border-style:none none solid solid; "|Event
| style="border-style:none none solid solid; "|Date
| style="border-style:none none solid solid; "|Round
| style="border-style:none none solid solid; "|Time
| style="border-style:none none solid solid; "|Notes
|-
|Win|| Tetsuo Kondo || Submission (rear–naked choke) || Wardog 08 × Gra-chan 21|| 2016|| 1|| 0:33||
|-
|Win|| Toru Harai || Submission (triangle armbar) || Club Fight|| 2008|| 1|| 1:37||
|-
|Win|| Karl Amoussou || Submission (triangle choke) || Budo Challenge -87 kg|| 2006|| 1|| N/A ||
|-
|Draw|| Sanae Kikuta and  Takeshi Yamazaki || Points || The Contenders X-Rage Vol.1|| December 14, 2001|| 1|| 10:00||Partnered with  Minoru Suzuki
|-
|Draw|| Minoru Suzuki and  Takafumi Ito || Points || The Contenders 5 Prospective M-1|| October 6, 2001|| 1|| 10:00||Partnered with  Caol Uno
|-
|Draw|| Mitsuyoshi Hayakawa || Points || The Contenders 4 Prospective|| 2000|| 2|| 5:00||
|-
|Loss|| Vernon White || Points || ADCC 1999 –99 kg|| 1999|| 1|| 10:00||
|-
|Loss|| Nobuhiro Tsurumaki || Submission (toe hold) || The Contenders|| 1999|| 2|| 01:16||
|-

See also
List of male mixed martial artists

References

External links
 
 
PRIDE profile

Living people
Japanese male mixed martial artists
Welterweight mixed martial artists
Middleweight mixed martial artists
Mixed martial artists utilizing kickboxing
Mixed martial artists utilizing boxing
Japanese male kickboxers
1978 births
Sportspeople from Tokyo
Ultimate Fighting Championship male fighters